Mantisatta is a genus of Southeast Asian jumping spiders that was first described by C. A. Warburton in 1900.  it contains only two species, found only in Indonesia and the Philippines: M. longicauda and M. trucidans. The name is a combination of "mantis", in reference to its long first legs, and the common salticid suffix -attus.

References

External links
 Photograph of M. longicauda

Salticidae genera
Salticidae
Spiders of Asia